Pinus serotina, the pond pine, marsh pine or pocosin pine, is a pine tree found along the Southeastern portion of the Atlantic coastal plain of the United States, from southern New Jersey south to Florida and west to southern Alabama.

Its cones are usually serotinous, requiring fire to open. The pond pine is found in wet habitats near ponds, bays, swamps, and pocosins. Often found among long leaf pines due to their high flammability and the pond pines need for fire to germinate.

The species name serotina is derived from the persistently unopened cones that may remain closed for several years before they release their seeds; the opening is often in response to forest fires.

At the north end of its range, it intergrades and hybridizes with pitch pine (P. rigida); it is distinguished from that species by the longer needles and on average slightly larger cones. Some botanists treat pond pine as a subspecies of pitch pine.

References 

 

serotina
Trees of the Southeastern United States
Trees of the Northeastern United States
Least concern flora of the United States
Trees of the United States